Michael Breckenridge is an actor, musician, journalist and artist.

Biography 
Breckenridge graduated from the University of Washington, Seattle with a Bachelor's degree in Communications, specializing in Broadcast Journalism. He worked in Nashville, Tennessee, as a music journalist. He has extensively toured the United States. He has been seen in several major motion pictures, and heard (as the composer) in several films, and as the voiceover artist in television commercials. He is also an artist, specializing in wood and stone carvings.

Personal Details 
 Michael created the film The Creature From Grim River for the 2006 Interstate Fair Film Festival in Spokane, Washington.

Filmography 
 June Cabin (2006) Composer
 The Cutter (2005) Actor
 Mozart and the Whale (2005) Actor
 Relativity (2005) Composer
  (2005) Composer
 The Laundromatters (2005) Composer
  (2004) Composer

External links 

Living people
Writers from Washington (state)
Year of birth missing (living people)